Nicole Theriault (born June 23, 1972), known as Nikki, is a Thai singer and actress, who went platinum with 2 million copies sold on her debut album Ka-Po-Lo Club and went double platinum on her second album Funny Lady earning her Breakout Artist of the Year for her first album and Best Female Artist of the Year for her second album. She has released a total of 13 albums which includes 5 solo albums and the remaining being collaborations and cover albums.

Early life and education 
Born in California, Theriault is the daughter of a French American father, Robert Theriault, and a Thai mother, Pornthip Theriault. Her father worked for thirty years for the Tourism Authority of Thailand as a producer on television and radio to promote tourism in Thailand. Her mother worked as a guidance councilor for underprivileged women and dedicated her life to helping abused women. Her parents met at a graduate school after her mother got her BA degree in political science from Chulalongkorn University. Her father served in the United States Air Force and was assigned to NASA in a training mission with the astronauts of Apollo 11 and was never sent to Vietnam. She is related to the Theriault family in Edmundston, New Brunswick.

Theriault began her schooling in Bangkok at Twinkle Star Kindergarten and attended grades one through three at Ruamrudee International School. She continued her education for the next three years at the Preparatory School in the United States. Her family then returned to Bangkok, where she completed her secondary education. She attended Assumption University for two years, but finished her B.A. degree in Arts at Framingham College in Massachusetts. She also earned a bachelor's degree in business at Columbia College in Chicago Illinois.

Theriault began her career after returning to Thailand. She has been active in producing music, singing, acting, and performing live in theatre and concerts since 1998 until present day.

Personal life 
Theriault married singer/producer Jirasuk Panphum on January 24, 2004. She gave birth to their son, Aaron Achira Theriault, on 8 February 2005. Theriault and Panphum announced on 15 February 2008, that they have ended their marriage.

Discography

Albums 
 1998 – Ka-Po-Lo Club (กะ-โป-โล-คลับ)
 1999 – Funny Lady (บุษบาหน้าเป็น)
 2000 – Another Part Of Me
 2000 – Seven
 2001 – นิโคลพันธุ์ดุ (Dangerous Nicole)
 2001 – Merry Christmas
 2001 – PlayTime
 2002 – Two Faces Of Love
 2003 – หัวใจเดินทาง(On the Way)
 2004 – Asanee Pee Nong Rong Praeng
 2013 – Single Eek Krung Nung (Music Move)
 2015 – Single Numtah Yod Naiy (Music Move)
 2016 – Single Tua Tid Gun (Music Move)
 2017 – Nicole Theriault Best Selected (GMM Grammy Records)
 2018 – Master's Collection (GMM Grammy Records)
 2018 – Hai Okard Charn Noi (ให้โอกาสฉันหน่อย)
 2019 – Rewrite The Stars (cover version)

Special albums 
 1999 – Funny Lady Acoustic Version (บุษบาหน้าเป็น อะคูสติกเวอร์ชัน)
 2000 – Another Part Of Me
 2000 – Seven
 2001 – Playtime
 2001 – Merry Christmas
 2002 – Two Faces Of Love
 2007 – Nicole Beautiful Life

Stage/Theatre Performance 
 2000 – Aroka Jom Yakub Yajai
 2009 – Breath The Musical (Lomhaijai The Musical)
 2013 – Laddaland
 2018 – Still on My Mind the Musical

Filmography 

Her leading international roles include HBO's 'Halfworlds'in 2016 and NETFLIX's 'Innocence: Bangkok Love Story'in 2018. She headlined in numerous musicals, the first with Thongchai McIntyre, Thailand's mega superstar, followed by 'Breathe the Musical', Laddaland, a thriller drama with Mos Pattiparn and her latest theater performance was at the end of 2018 as the lead in 'Still on My Mind the Musical'at Muangthai Rachadalai Theater (all musicals performed here: Thailand's equivalent of Broadway).
Nicole has released a single a year as an independent artist after leaving GMM Grammy Records and has just released a cover version of 'Rewrite the Stars' in June 2019 with Thailand's entrepreneur Patee Sarasin (previous owner of Nok Air).
Her current work is showing on Channel One 31 Mondays through Thursdays at 7 pm in a comedy series 'Leila TidaYuk' and is shooting an upcoming TV drama as Rose in 
'Dont Touch My Dad' which will air on PPTV in August.

Movie discography
 2002 – One Night Husband (Kuen Rai Ngaow)
 2009 – Phobia 2 (5 Praeng)
2012 – Virgin Am I
2015 – Zero Tolerance
2016 – Face Off 
2021 - The Whole Truth (Netflix)

Television

Drama 

 Niyai Rak Phak 2 (Channel 5, 1999) (Guest)
 RUN Rak Antarai (Channel 5, 2001)
 Bunga Nafon (Channel 5, 2011)
 Manya Ritsaya (Channel 5, 2012)
 Luk Phi Luk Nong (Channel 9, 2013)
 The Sixth Sense 2 (Channel 3, 2013)
 Ruean Ritsaya (Channel 3, 2014) (Guest)
 Leh Nangfah (Channel 5, 2014)
 Buang Man (Channel 3, 2014)
 Ugly Betty Thailand (Thairath TV, 2015)
 Halfworlds (HBO Asia, 2015)
 Buang Rak Salak Khaen (Channel 8, 2016)
 Khwam Rak Khrang Sut Tai (GMM, 2017)
 Innocence (Netflix. Worldwide, 2018)
 Leila Tida Yuk (Channel One 31 2019 – now showing Mon-Thurs 7 pm
 Dont Touch My Dad (PPTV 2019 –
In production. Scheduled air date: August 2019

TV Program 

Dancing with the Stars (Thailand season 1) (channel 7, 2013)
The Mask Singer (Workpoint, 2017)
I Can See Your Voice Thailand (Workpoint, 2017)
The Next Boy/Girl Band Thailand (channel 7, 2018)

Awards 

 Nominated 1998 MTV Video Music Awards by MTV Asia : International Viewer's Choice Awards : Nicole Theriault – "Kapolo"
 Winner (Kom Chud Luk Award) Best Actress in a Leading Role in a Motion Picture 'One Night Busband
 Winner (Top Award 2000) Artist of the Year
 Nominated Best Actress in a Leading Role 'Phobia 2'
 Winner ELLE Style Awards 2001
 Awarded by His Majesty the King Rama X (then His Royal Highness Crown Prince Cbulalongkorn) Person of the Year in Public Service in Performing Arts

References

External links 

Nicole Theriault
1973 births
Living people
Framingham State University alumni
Nicole Theriault
Nicole Theriault
Nicole Theriault
Nicole Theriault

Nicole Theriault
Nicole Theriault
Nicole Theriault
Nicole Theriault
Nicole Theriault
Nicole Theriault
Nicole Theriault